Freeverse Inc. (originally Freeverse Software) was a developer of computer and video game and desktop software based in New York City which was acquired by Ngmoco in 2010. Ngmoco was itself acquired later that year, and shut down in 2016.

History
Ian Lynch Smith founded Freeverse in 1994 as a shareware company. The first product was a version of Hearts Deluxe for the Mac that used game artificial intelligence based on Smith's studies in cognitive science, the subject for which he received his degree from Vassar College. On February 22, 2010, it was announced that Freeverse had been acquired by ngmoco.

On October 12, 2010, Japanese-based DeNA announced its acquisition of ngmoco for $400,000,000. Ngmoco became the regional headquarters for all Western subsidiaries of DeNA, including studios in Vancouver, Santiago de Chile, Amsterdam, and Stockholm. However, on October 18, 2016, DeNA  announced the closure of all Western subsidiaries, including ngmoco.

Mac games

Original titles
 3D Bridge Deluxe
 3D Hearts Deluxe
 3D Pitch Deluxe
 3D Euchre Deluxe
 3D Spades Deluxe
 3D Crazy Eights
 Active Lancer
 Airburst
 Airburst Extreme
 Arcane Arena
 Atlas: The Gift Of Aramai
 Big Bang Board Games
 Big Bang Brain Games
 Burning Monkey
 Burning Monkey Casino
 Burning Monkey Puzzle Lab
 Burning Monkey Solitaire
 Burning Monkey Mahjong
 Classic Cribbage
Classic Gin Rummy
 Deathground
 Enigma
 Hoyle Casino 2009
 Hoyle Puzzle And Board 2009
 Hoyle Cards 2009
 Kill Monty
 Neon Tango
 Solace
 ToySight
 WingNuts: Temporal Navigator
 WingNuts 2: Raina's Revenge

Ports
 Heroes of Might and Magic V
 Legion
 Legion Arena
 Jeopardy! Deluxe
 Wheel of Fortune Deluxe!
 Commander: Europe at War
 Commander: Napoleon at War
 Marathon 2: Durandal for Xbox LIVE Arcade
 Field of Glory

Published games
 8th Wonder Of The World
 Hordes Of Orcs
 KnightShift
 Massive Assault
 Northland
 Payback
 Project Nomads
 Robin Hood: The Legend Of Sherwood
 Spartan
 X2: The Threat

iOS games
 Big Bang Sudoku
 MotoChaser
 Warpgate
 Jared Smith
 SimStapler
 Big Bang Board Games
 Tranquility Application|Tranquility
 Burning Monkey Puzzle Lab
 Flick Bowling
 Plank Game|Plank
 Flick Fishing
 Flick Baseball Pro
 Burning Monkey Casino
 SlotZ Racer
 Days of Thunder!
 Top Gun
 Grunts (video game)|Grunts
 Fairy Trails
 Postman
 Flick NBA Basketball
 Eye Glasses
 Skee-Ball
 Parachute Ninja

Applications
 BumperCar
 Comic Life - Created by plasq
 Lineform
 MacAddict Menu Madness
Periscope
 Sound Studio

See also 
:Category:Freeverse Inc. games

References

Ngmoco
Video game development companies
Video game publishers
Macintosh software companies
Video game companies of the United States
Companies based in New York City
Video game companies established in 1994